No Way to Forget is an Australian short film. It is written and directed by Richard Frankland, produced by John Foss and stars David Ngoombujarra in the lead role as SHANE FRANCIS. It is the first film by an indigenous director to win an AFI Award. It was broadcast nationally on SBS TV. It screened at the 1996 Cannes Film Festival in the category of Un Certain Regard.

No Way to Forget is based on Frankland's experiences while working as a Field Officer for the Royal Commission into Aboriginal Deaths in Custody.

Awards
 AFI Award (1996) – Best Short Film
 AFI Award (1996) – Best Screenplay in a Short Film
 St Kilda Film Festival (2000) – Best New Director
 Cannes International Film Festival (1996) – Un Certain Regard

References

External links
Golden Seahorse Productions

1996 films
1996 short films
Australian drama short films
Films set in Australia
1996 drama films
1990s English-language films
1990s Australian films
Films about Aboriginal Australians